Barringer Mansion is a historic home located at 1404 Jefferson Park Avenue in Charlottesville, Virginia. It was built in 1894, and is a two-story, Queen Anne style brick dwelling.  It features an elaborate turret with garland frieze adorning the cornice, three different styles of windows, and Jacobean chimneys.  It was the home of Paul Brandon Barringer (1857-1941), noted physician, scientist, executive, and publisher who became chairman of the faculty at the University of Virginia (then equivalent to president), and later the sixth president of Virginia Tech.

In 1967 a subsequent owner converted the large home into apartments. The University of Virginia Medical School Foundation purchased the property in 1981 with plans to use it as an annex to the university's medical facilities. It was listed on the National Register of Historic Places in 1982.

It is now owned by the University of Virginia and serves as the French Language Residence for students.

References

Houses on the National Register of Historic Places in Virginia
Houses completed in 1894
Queen Anne architecture in Virginia
Houses in Charlottesville, Virginia
National Register of Historic Places in Charlottesville, Virginia